Sports Club Villa is a professional football club based in Uganda.

Overview
SC Villa had humble beginnings in 1975, playing under the name Nakivubo Boys. The club was renamed Nakivubo Villa in 1981. SC Villa won promotion to the top flight of Ugandan football in 1979 and is the most successful club in Ugandan football. They have won 16 Uganda Super League Titles, 9 Ugandan Cup Titles and 3 CECAFA Clubs Cup Titles. SC Villa was the first Ugandan club to clinch a local double in 1986. That record was extended to six "Doubles" in 2002.

Today there is no single local or regional trophy on which SC Villa's name is not inscribed.The club has played in two consecutive finals of the African Cup of Champions Clubs and the CAF Cup in 1991 and 1992, respectively. The club trains at Villa Park in Nsambya, Kampala.

Club Name History
1975–1979: Nakivubo Boys
1980: Nakivubo Villa
1981–Present: Sports Club Villa

Legal Owners
Villa Members' Trust

Past & Present Club Patrons
Kezekiah Ssegwanga Musisi
George Faison Ddamulira
Henry Balamaze Lwanga
Gerrald Kasozi
Franco Mugabe (Present)

Board of Trustees

Gerrald Ssendawula 
McDusman Kabega 
Omar Ahmed
Franco Mugabe
Fredrick Ivan Kawuma
Moses Matovu
William Nkemba

Past & Present Presidents

1. 1975 - 1979 : Daniel Musoke Kiwalabye (Assumed office as Founding Chairperson of Nakivubo Boys)

2. 1979 - Dec 1993 : Patrick Edward Kawooya 
(Assumed office through consensus with founding members)

3. Dec 1993 - July 2010 : Franco Mugabe 
(Assumed office through Club Delegates' Election)

4. Aug 2010 - Jul 2012 : Fred Muwema 
(Assumed office through Club Elders' Appointment)

5. Aug 2012 - Jul 2014 : Ahmed Ssemanda
(Assumed office through Club Elders' Appointment on Interim Basis)

6. Aug 2014 - Jul 2018 : Joseph Mbazzi Muguluma(Ben Immanuel Misagga) 
(Assumed office through Club Delegates' Election)

7. Jul 2018 - Nov 2021 : William Nkemba 
(Assumed office through Club Elders' Appointment on Interim Basis)

8. Nov 2021 - Todate : Omar Ahmed (Mandela)
(Assumed office through Villa Members' Trust Club Election)

Chief Executive Officer
William Nkemba

Record in the top tier

Current squad

Past & Present Head Coaches
Updated: July 2022.

  Joseph Kabundi (1975–1977)
  Fred Sekasi (1977–1978)
  Charles Jaggwe (1978-1981)
  George Mukasa (1981-1983)
  David Otti (1983–1985)
  Timothy Ayiekoh (1985)
  Polly Ouma (1986-1988)
  Geoff Hudson (1988-1991)
  Timothy Ayiekoh (1992-1994)
  David Otti (1995)
  Timothy Ayiekoh (1995-1996)
  Eddie Butindo (1996)
  David Otti (1997)
  Paul Edwin Hasule (1998-2001)
  Paul Nkata (2001)
  Moses Basena (2002)
  Mulutin Sredojevic (2002-2004)
  Sam Timbe (2004–2006)
  Ibrahim Kirya (2006)
  Asuman Lubowa (2006–2008)
  Sula Kato (2008-2010)
  Zivojnov Srdjan (2010–2011)
  Mike Mutebi (2011-2012)
  Paul Nkata (2012-2013)
  Hussein Mbalangu (2013)
  Steven Bogere (2013-2014)
  Sam Ssimbwa (2014–2015)
  Antonio Flores (2015)
  Ibrahim Kirya (2015-2016)
  Deo Sserwadda (2016)
  Shafik Bisaso (2016–2017)
  Wasswa Bbossa (2017-2018)
  Moses Basena (2018)
  Douglas Bamweyana (2018-2019)
  Edward Kaziba (2019-2021)
  Petros Koukouras (2021-2022)
  Jackson Magera (2022-Todate)

Achievements
Updated: September 2015

Ugandan Premier League: 16
1982, 1984, 1986, 1987, 1988, 1989, 1990, 1992, 1994, 1998, 1999, 2000, 2001, 2002, 2003, 2004

Ugandan Cup: 9
1983, 1986, 1988, 1989, 1998, 2000, 2002, 2009, 2015

CECAFA Clubs Cup: 3
1987, 2003, 2005

Performance in CAF competitions
Updated: September 2010

 African Cup of Champions Clubs: 6 appearances 

1983 – Quarter-Finals
1985 – First Round
1987 – Second Round
1988 – Second Round
1991 – Finalist

1993 – Quarter-Finals

 CAF Champions League: 7 appearances
1999 – Second Round
2000 – Preliminary Round
2001 – Second Round
2002 – First Round

2003 – First Round
2004 – First Round
2005 – First Round

 CAF Confederation Cup: 1 appearance
2010 – Withdrew in Preliminary Round

 CAF Cup: 2 appearances
1992 – Finalist
1994 – Disqualified in First Round

 CAF Cup Winners' Cup: 3 appearances
1984 – Quarter-Finals
1989 – First Round
1990 – First Round

Notable Club Legends
Updated: September 2018

Abbey Mutanda
Mike Mukasa
Jamil Kasirye
Geoffrey Kisitu
Shaban Mwinda
Moses Ndaula
Rogers Nsubuga
Davis Kamoga 
Livingstone Kyobe
Dan Kitalo
Zaid Tebesiggwa
Edward Nansamba 
Ronald Vvubya 
Sunday Mokili
Godfrey Kateregga 
Twaha Kivumbi 
Sula Kato 
William Nkemba 
Stephen Bogere 
George Otto
Joseph Dramiga 
Charles Katumba  
Adam Semugabi
Idi Batambuze 
Robert Semakula
Enock Kyembe
Said Abedi
Adam Semugabi
Charles Katumba
John Kawesi
Yusuf Ssonko
Issa Kawooya
Alex Olum
Robert Ssemakula 
Paul Mukatabala 
Magid Musisi
Wilson Nsobya
Sam Tamale
George Mukasa
Timothy Ayiekoh
Paul Hasule 
Hakim Magumba
Andy Mwesigwa
Edgar Watson
Hassan Mubiru
Dennis Onyango
Andrew Mukasa
Mathias Kaweesa
Isaac Kirabira
Steven Bengo
Emmanuel Okwi
Isaac Muleme
Godfrey Walusimbi
Tonny Ndolo
Timothy Batabaire

References

External links
 Official club site

Villa
Association football clubs established in 1975
Sport in Kampala
1975 establishments in Uganda